Laura Burns (born Kerry Shepard) is a fictional character from the long-running Channel 4 soap opera Hollyoaks, played by Lesley Crawford between November 2000 and 2002.

Character creation
Actress Lesley Crawford was part of the first Hollyoaks: On the Pull campaign to find new young actors and actresses to appear in the show. Crawford originally auditioned in Belfast, she was put through to the final round at the Liverpool auditions where she won the role. The other three chosen were Marcus Patric, Andrew Somerville and Elize du Toit. She had three months in which to prepare for filming. In 2002, Lesley quit the series to pursue her lifelong ambition of becoming a midwife.

Character development
Laura was often shown on-screen doing outlandish things such as stealing and having no guilty conscience afterwards. Laura also had psychotic tendencies, of which Crawford theorized: "I think she's been alone for a lot of her life and she's scared of that. I play it as if there's a mental disorder there."

Storylines
Laura arrived in Tony Hutchinson’s (Nick Pickard) student house and soon found herself fending off Tony’s advances. Laura struggled to finance her first year of college, reaching such desperate measures that she stole the cloakroom money from The Loft. She soon had a fit of conscience and owned up to what she had done.

Laura then became friends with Mandy Richardson (Sarah Jayne Dunn), but then she began to develop an unhealthy obsession with Mandy’s life, which reached its peak when she started dating Luke Morgan (Gary Lucy). After the relationship fizzled out, Laura continued to drive a wedge between Mandy and Luke, and seemed to enjoy the problems Mandy had when Mandy's brother Lewis Richardson (Ben Hull) committed suicide. After Mandy and her mother Helen became estranged, Laura filled the gap and enjoyed being part of the Cunningham family.

As Laura continued to control Mandy, Laura's brother Brendan arrived in the village and started calling her Kerry, but Laura refused to recognise him. Laura wanted to get away from Hollyoaks and decided to go Cape Town and take Mandy with her. 
However, when Mandy felt suspicious and rejected Laura, Laura reacted by hitting her on the head with a glass bottle.
Laura continued to taunt Mandy as she locked Mandy and herself in Mandy’s flat until Tony arrived with Becca Hayton (Ali Bastian), Max Cunningham (Matt Littler), Adam Morgan (David Brown), and Brendan to rescue Mandy and get some help for Laura. It turned out that Laura’s real name was Kerry, and Laura was taken from her best friend’s name who had died at the age of 11. Kerry was still recovering from that, and since then, Kerry found Mandy as a replacement to Laura and had more feeling for Mandy than a friend and had tried to keep Mandy to herself. Laura is most likely still in the mental institution she was taken into after trying to kill herself and Mandy.

Reception
Television magazine What's on TV said that Laura became Hollyoaks answer to Single White Female as her obsession "took hold".

References

Hollyoaks characters
Television characters introduced in 2000
Female characters in television